St. Margaret's School (Secondary) (SMSS) is a government-aided autonomous girls' secondary school in Bukit Timah, Singapore, under the purview of the Anglican Diocese of Singapore. It is the first girls' school in Singapore and often regarded as the oldest existing girls' school in Southeast Asia.

History 
St. Margaret's School is the oldest girls' school in Singapore. It was founded in 1842 by Maria Dyer, a missionary of the London Missionary Society. The school started off from a shophouse located at North Bridge Road. In 1853 the Society for Promotion of Female Education in the East sent Sophia Cooke to Singapore to become the Principal of what was then called the Chinese Girls' School. Cooke would use her influence to persuade the Anglican chaplain to begin a mission there. The society paid Cooke's salary but she had to rely on fund raising to keep the school viable. She arranged for Christian services to be conducted in Chinese in the school grounds. During Cooke's tenure as the principal of the school, the school was known as Miss Cooke's School.

In 1900, the Church of England Zenana Missionary Society took over the school and renamed the school after itself as Church of England Zenana Missionary (CEZMS) School.

In 1949, the Bishop of Singapore, Reverend Leonard Wilson rename it as St. Margaret's School in 1949 after Queen Margaret of Scotland.

The secondary section was split from the primary in 1960 and it moved into new premises along Farrer Road.

On 16 November 2022, the school announced that it will be renamed to St. Margaret's School (Secondary) from 1 January 2023.

Identity & culture

Crest 
The green background represents creation, of which we are a part. It stands for life and activity, creativity and growth.

The white band running diagonally across from the upper left-hand corner to the lower right-hand corner stands for purity in thought, word and deed.

The white cross represents the Christian mission of the school. Like a directional compass, it shows the right way to take and it points us to God's love, truth and provision.

Motto 
Charity, Patience, Devotion

Uniform 
The school uniform is a one-piece dress which features a dark green polka-dotted top, a dark green skirt up to knee length and a dark green school tie with the school logo pinned at the bottom. There are also separate PE shorts, a shirt with different colours depending on different houses and a CCA skirt. White school socks with or without the SMSS logo can be worn. A name tag is worn. The only jacket allowed is the black school jacket or any plain black jacket, and earrings are restricted to plain studs of green, white, black, gold or silver. Hair accessories can only be dark green, white and black. Despite this, coloured top undergarments are not allowed - only white or nude colours are permissible.

Affiliation 
St. Margaret's Secondary School is affiliated with St. Margaret's Primary School (SMPS) and Saint Andrew's Junior College (SAJC).

Academic information 
Being a non-special programme secondary school, St. Margaret's Secondary School offers three academic streams, namely the four-year Express course, as well as the Normal Course, comprising Normal (Academic) and Normal (Technical) academic tracks.

O Level Express Course 
The Express Course is a nationwide four-year programme that leads up to the Singapore-Cambridge G.C.E. Ordinary Level examination.

Academic subjects 
The examinable academic subjects for Singapore-Cambridge G.C.E. Ordinary Level offered by the school for upper secondary level (via. streaming in secondary 2 level), as of 2017, are listed below.

Notes:
 Subjects indicated with ' * ' are mandatory subjects.
 All students in Singapore are required to undertake a Mother Tongue Language as an examinable subject, as indicated by ' ^ '

Normal Course 
The Normal Course is a nationwide 4-year programme leading to the Singapore-Cambridge GCE Normal Level examination, which runs either the Normal (Academic) curriculum or Normal (Technical) curriculum, abbreviated as N(A) and N(T) respectively.

Normal (Academic) Course 
In the Normal (Academic) course, students offer 5-8 subjects in the Singapore-Cambridge GCE Normal Level examination. Compulsory subjects include:
 English Language
 Mother Tongue Language
 Mathematics
 Combined Humanities
A 5th year leading to the Singapore-Cambridge GCE Ordinary Level examination is available to N(A) students who perform well in their Singapore-Cambridge GCE Normal Level examination. Students can move from one course to another based on their performance and the assessment of the school principal and teachers.

Normal (Technical) Course 
The Normal (Technical) course prepares students for a technical-vocational education at the Institute of Technical Education. Students will offer 5-7 subjects in the Singapore-Cambridge GCE Normal Level examination. The curriculum is tailored towards strengthening students’ proficiency in English and Mathematics. Students take English Language, Mathematics, Basic Mother Tongue and Computer Applications as compulsory subjects.

Notable alumni 
 Lee Lin Chin, TV Newsreader and presenter, SBS-TV, Sydney, Australia 
 Eunice Olsen: Former Nominated Member of Parliament; television presenter
 Daphne Khoo: Fourth, Singapore Idol
 Stephanie Sun: Singaporean singer-songwriter

External links 
 Official website
 St. Margaret's Ex-Students' Association (SMESA)

References 

Secondary schools in Singapore
Bukit Timah
Girls' schools in Singapore
Autonomous schools in Singapore
Anglican schools in Singapore
Schools in Central Region, Singapore